Islamic Revolutionary Court (also Revolutionary Tribunal, Dadgahha-e Enqelab) (Persian: دادگاه انقلاب اسلامی) is a special system of courts in the Islamic Republic of Iran designed to try those suspected of crimes such as smuggling, blaspheming, inciting violence or trying to overthrow the Islamic government. The court started its work after the 1979 Iranian Revolution.

Jurisdiction
The jurisdiction of the Revolutionary Courts, as amended in 1983, encompasses
All of the offenses against the internal and external security of the Country, combating and behaving in a corruptly manner on the earth. 
Uttering slander against the Founder of the Islamic Republic of Iran and the Honorable Leader. 
Conspiracy against the Islamic Republic of Iran or carrying arms, use of terrorism, destruction of building against the Islamic Republic.
Engaging in espionage for aliens. 
All crimes involving smugglings and narcotic items. 
The cases pertinent to Article 49 of the Constitution of Iran.

Disputes over jurisdiction between the Revolutionary Courts and Iranian Penal Courts are resolved by the Iranian Supreme Court. To date, according to the Lawyers Committee for Human Rights, "it appears that there is a tendency to extend the jurisdiction of the Revolutionary Courts to all offenses which in the opinion of the authorities are not punished severely enough."

The trials are not public, there is no jury, and a single judge decides the matter at hand. Information on the trial is disclosed at the discretion of the government.

History

Revolution
The revolutionary courts were created shortly after the overthrow of the monarchy and the arrival of Ayatollah Ruhollah Khomeini in Iran. The general goal of the court is thought to have been to seek vengeance against officials of the Shah's regime (particularly SAVAK) – as many revolutionaries had lost friends and family members at the hands of the government – and to eliminate military and civilian leaders who might foment a counter-revolution against Islamic rule.

The first tribunal was convened secretly in Refah School in southern Tehran where Khomeini had set up his headquarters. The first four death sentences were issued by Hojjat al-Islam Sadegh Khalkhali, approved by Khomeini, and carried out in the early hours of February 16, 1979. By early November, 550 people – mostly military and SAVAK –  had been sent to the firing squads by revolutionary tribunals. Revolutionary Tribunals were set up in the major towns, with two courts in the capital of Tehran – one each in the prisons of Qasr and Evin, and one traveling tribunal for Sadegh Khalkhali who was known for handing out many death sentences.  The courts presiding judges were clerics appointed by Khomeini himself.

At least at first, the revolutionary courts differ from standard Western law courts by limiting trials to a few hours, sometimes minutes. Defendants could be found guilty on the basis of "popular repute." The concept of defense attorney was dismissed as a "Western absurdity." A charge that was widely applied against defendants but unfamiliar to some was Mofsed-e-filarz, or "spreading corruption on earth". This covered a variety of offenses – "insulting Islam and the clergy," "opposing the Islamic Revolution," "supporting the Pahlavis," and "undermining Iran's independence" by helping the 1953 coup and giving capitulatory privileges to the imperial powers".

The secrecy, vagueness of charges, lack of opportunity for defendants to defend themselves came under criticism from people such as Ayatollah Mohammad Kazem Shariatmadari, Hassan Tabatabai-Qomi and Prime Minister Mehdi Bazargan.  But the court's swift and harsh sentences also had strong support from both Islamists and leftist groups such as the Tudeh party and People's Mujahedin of Iran. Khomeini responded to complaints saying that "criminals should not be tried, they should be killed". Judge Khalkhali stated "The revolutionary courts were born out of the anger of the Iranian people and these people will not accept any principles outside Islamic principles". Attempts by Bazargan to appeal to Khomeini to restrict the courts only led to the courts becoming "stronger and more firmly entrenched".

Since 1980
According to political scientist and historian Ervand Abrahamian, the Revolutionary Courts participated in the secret mass killings of thousands of imprisoned members of the People's Mujahedin of Iran and other leftist organizations in 1988. 

Although the Revolutionary Court normally deals with major economic and security crimes, in 2006 it was scheduled to try Cartoonist Mana Neyestani and his editor-in-chief Mehrdad Qassemfar "for inciting ethnic unrest" after a Neyestani cartoon triggered protests and violence among the Azerbaijani-speaking population in northwestern parts of Iran after appearing in a weekly supplement "Iran Jomeh."

See also
Judicial system of the Islamic Republic of Iran
Special Clerical Court
Criticism of Islam
Freedom of speech in Iran
Corruption in Iran
Smuggling in Iran

References

External links
Human Rights Watch Condemns Killing Of Iranian Civilians June 3, 1998
Zan Censored 6 April 1999

Iranian Revolution
Ruhollah Khomeini
Judiciary of Iran
Law of Iran
1979 establishments in Iran
Courts and tribunals established in 1979
Islamic courts and tribunals